Michelle Ang (born 17 October 1983) is a New Zealand actress. She is best known for her role as Lori Lee in the Australian television soap opera Neighbours, and for voicing the female Jango Fett clone Omega in the animated series Star Wars: The Bad Batch.

Early life and education
Ang was born in Christchurch and is of Malaysian Chinese descent. Ang was a talented ballet dancer when she was younger and performed in The Nutcracker, A Midsummer Night's Dream and Romeo and Juliet with the Royal New Zealand Ballet. Later she completed studies at Victoria University of Wellington for a double degree: a Bachelor of Commerce and Administration (B.C.A.) in Accounting with Commercial Law and a Bachelor of Science in Chemistry.

Ang has named The Power of Now by Eckhart Tolle as the book that has most influenced her.

Career

Television
Ang got her start in television at a young age through the family series Young Entertainers. Here, she got to show her skills at singing and dancing, much like The Mickey Mouse Club show on US television. She played Tai-San in the New Zealand post-apocalyptic drama The Tribe as part of the core cast from 1999 to 2001, and featured in the final episodes of the 2002 series. Ang also guest starred in the final 2 episodes of Xena: Warrior Princess as Akemi.

She played Lori Lee in the Australian television soap opera Neighbours, in which she was a major character from 2002 to 2003; she left Neighbours to finish her university studies but returned briefly in 2004. Ang was nominated for a Logie Award for Most Popular New Female Talent for her role in Neighbours. She played the role of Tracy Hong in the first two seasons of the New Zealand TV series Outrageous Fortune in 2005 and 2006. In 2007, Ang appeared in the American television drama South of Nowhere.

In 2012, Ang featured in the MTV series Underemployed as an aspiring writer who has to settle for working at a donut shop.

In 2015, Ang starred in the web series Fear the Walking Dead: Flight 462 as Alex, a passenger caught on a flight at the beginning of the zombie apocalypse, and went on to appear in the main series Fear the Walking Dead. Ang received an Emmy nomination for her work on Flight 462. In 2020 she had a recurring role on The New Legends of Monkey.

In 2021, Ang starred in the Disney+ original animated series Star Wars: The Bad Batch as Omega, a mysterious female clone of Jango Fett. She was invited to keep her native New Zealand accent for the role in homage to fellow New Zealander Temuera Morrison, who portrayed Jango Fett in the franchise.

Film
Ang made her feature film debut in 2004's Futile Attraction. Ang had also appeared in a series of low-budget New Zealand short films including Forbidden Fury and Take 3. In 2006 she appeared in No.2, directed by Toa Fraser. In 2011 Ang portrayed a nerdy Chinese New Zealander in the romantic comedy My Wedding and Other Secrets, her first lead role in a feature. It won her the Best Lead Actress in a Feature Film award at the 2011 Aotearoa Film & Television Awards. Her other film credits include Big Mommas: Like Father, Like Son and Triple 9. 

Ang auditioned for the Cho Chang role in Harry Potter and the Goblet of Fire, but in the end the role was given to Katie Leung. Prior to her role in The Bad Batch, Ang also had auditioned for a role in Star Wars: The Last Jedi.

Personal life
Ang has a son.

Filmography

Film

Television

Awards and nominations

References

External links

1983 births
Living people
20th-century New Zealand actresses
21st-century New Zealand actresses
New Zealand expatriate actresses in the United States
New Zealand film actresses
New Zealand television actresses
People from Christchurch
New Zealand people of Chinese descent
New Zealand people of Malaysian descent
Victoria University of Wellington alumni